Robin Brûlé is a Canadian actress, who is best known for her role as Susan Hunter in the Roxy Hunter series.

Filmography

Film

Television

References

External link

Canadian film actresses
Canadian television actresses
George Brown College alumni
Living people
Year of birth missing (living people)